Paul Ross Spadafora (born September 5, 1975) is an American retired professional boxer. He is the former IBF lightweight champion of the world, and has challenged once for a light welterweight world title.

Personal background
Known as "The Pittsburgh Kid", Spadafora is from McKees Rocks, a borough outside of Pittsburgh, Pennsylvania. His childhood was poverty-stricken: his father died of a drug overdose when he was nine, and he was homeless for several weeks as a teenager. He started boxing when he was eleven, and left school in 9th grade to focus on it.

Amateur career
Spadafora had a fruitful amateur career, winning 75 of 80 bouts.

Professional career

Paul Spadafora was trained by Tom Yankello. On October 18, 1995, Spadafora made his professional debut, winning a four-round knockout of Steve Maddux. He won a total of four fights in his initial year.

In 1996, he fought eight times, winning all, six by knockout. In 1997, he fought six times, but his percentage of knockout wins dropped considerably when he only won two of those six bouts by knockout.

In 1998, he continued his winning ways throughout the year, winning all six bouts, three by knockout.  One of the KO's took place on the exhibition bout card, featuring long-retired veteran Dan Maloney and Tim Witherspoon.

He began 1999 by raising his quality of opposition, facing the veteran Rocky Martinez. He won that fight by a unanimous decision, and after one more win he and Israel Cardona met in Chester for the I.B.F.'s vacant world crown on August 20. An underdog in the betting lines, Spadafora nevertheless became world champion, defeating Cardona in a 12-round decision. Then he retained the title with an 11-round knockout of Renato Cornett to finish the year.

He opened 2000 with a 12-round decision over Victoriano Sosa to retain the title, and subsequently defended his title again by knockout over Mike Griffith in round 11, and beat Billy Irwin in a 12-round decision to close the year.

By 2001, Spadafora was already a regular on the HBO Boxing television show. He retained the title with a 12-round decision over Joel Perez and won one non-title fight that year.

He began 2002 by retaining his title over Angel Manfredy with a 12-round decision. His only other bout that year was a 12-round decision win over Dennis Holbaek, also with his world title on the line.

Fight for unification

In 2003, Spadafora and WBA world champion Leonard Dorin from Romania decided to meet to try to unify their world titles. They met on May 18, but the fight was declared a draw, both boxers remaining as world champions in their respective organizations.

On June 27 of the same year, Spadafora announced he was relinquishing the IBF World Lightweight title to move to the Jr. Welterweight division because he was having trouble making weight in the Lightweight division.

Spadafora next fought on July 17, 2004, knocking out Costa Rica's Francisco Campos in ten rounds.

Troubles outside the ring
Spadafora was an alcoholic from a young age and at one point also abused drugs. He pleaded guilty to aggravated assault for shooting his girlfriend Nadine Russo in the chest in October 2003 after a night of drinking, and in February 2005 was sentenced to six months in a bootcamp-style rehabilitation center. He had by then become engaged to Russo and she had borne his second child. He ultimately went to prison for the crime.

In September and October 2011, Spadafora was twice arrested on DUI charges. The following September he pleaded guilty.

On September 23, 2012, his manager filed suit against him in Allegheny County court for breach of contract.

Comeback
Despite his troubles outside the ring, Spadafora repeatedly expressed his intention to return to the ring.  In November 2006 he returned after a 32-month layoff to stop Jesus Francisco Zepeda in round five at the Avalon Hotel in Erie, Pennsylvania.

On April 25, 2008, again in Erie, Spadafora returned to the ring to fight Shad Howard. Spadafora repeatedly connected with sharp jabs and combinations en route to an 80–72 unanimous decision.

In 2010 he defeated Italian boxer Ivan Fiorletta by knock out. In August 2012 he defeated Humberto Toledo.

One April 6, 2013, Spadafora defeated Robert Franckel for the NABF Super Lightweight Championship.

His record stands at 49–1–1 with 19 knockouts.

References

External links

Official Website

|-

Boxers from Pennsylvania
1975 births
Living people
People from McKees Rocks, Pennsylvania
Sportspeople from Pennsylvania
International Boxing Federation champions
People of Calabrian descent
American people of Italian descent
American male boxers
Lightweight boxers